The 1956 United States presidential election in Arizona took place on November 6, 1956, as part of the 1956 United States presidential election. States voters chose four representatives, or electors, to the Electoral College, who voted for president and vice president.

Arizona was won by incumbent President Dwight D. Eisenhower (R–Pennsylvania), running with Vice President Richard Nixon, with 60.99% of the popular vote, against Adlai Stevenson (D–Illinois), running with Senator Estes Kefauver, with 39.90% of the popular vote.

Eisenhower was the first Republican presidential candidate to ever carry Graham County, which was to become a Republican stronghold after 1964.

Results

Results by county

Notes

References

Arizona
1956
1956 Arizona elections